"Fresh!" is a song by Australian singer Gina G from her debut album, Fresh! (1997). Written by her with John Collins, Mark Taylor and Paul Barry, it was released in March 1997 as the third single by Gina G and shortly before the parent album. One of the CD releases contained an album teaser narrated by Mark Goodier. It was Gina's third and last top 10 hit, entering the UK charts at number six. The single spent seven weeks in the top 75 and a further six weeks in the top 200. Outside Europe, it charted in Australia and Israel, peaking at number 23 and 16.

Critical reception
Patrick McDonald from The Advertiser wrote that Gina G is "remaining in a joyous pop vein" with the "cheeky" song. J.D. Considine from The Baltimore Sun compared "Fresh!" to the songs that the Stock Aitken Waterman team devised for Rick Astley and Bananarama. Richard Paton from The Blade described it as a "peppy, R&B-influenced" song. Can't Stop the Pop deemed it a "retro-inspired bop", and "really fun, summery track once you’ve digested the shift in style. It’s a bit suggestive, a bit flirtatious and very, very catchy – the ad-libs towards the end of the song, in particular, are utterly joyous." Larry Printz from The Morning Call called it "melodic". British magazine Music Week rated it four out of five, declaring it as "a cheerful pop racer. A guaranteed smash." 

A reviewer from People Magazine viewed it as a "squeaky-clean Euro-disco blend of rushing synth melodies, chirpy vocals and dial-a-hook lyrics (like "I wanna get fresh/ With you, baby/I wanna do all the things that turn you on")." Pop Rescue complimented it as "pure summer time pop, with Gina putting in a seemingly effortless vocal performance as she blatantly delivers some sexy lyrics". John Everson from SouthtownStar said it "is equally as "chewable" as "Ooh Aah... Just a Little Bit", "with a funky guitar line, background crowd cheers and a sassy, sultry Gina". British newspaper Sunday Mirror stated that the "sparkly" Aussie "bounces back with a mid-Eighties Madonna soundalike", adding that the song is not as "high energy" as her last two hits.

Chart performance
"Fresh!" was a moderate success on the charts on several continents. In Europe, it made it to the top 10 in both Scotland and the United Kingdom. In the latter, the single went straight to number six in its first week at the UK Singles Chart, on 16 March 1997. It spent two weeks inside the top 10, and was Gina's last top 10 hit to date. Additionally, it was a top 30 hit in Ireland, and a top 40 hit in Iceland, as well as on the Eurochart Hot 100, where "Fresh!" hit number 35 in April 1997. In Germany, it only reached number 83. Outside Europe, the single peaked at number 16 in Israel and number 23 in Gina's native Australia.

Music video
A music video was produced to promote the single, directed by Cary Grim. It features Gina G performing in a car, on the beach and in a swimming pool. The video was shot in Miami.

Track listings

 12", Germany (0630 18329)
"Fresh!" (Apollo 440 Remix) — 7:53
"Fresh!" (Apollo 440 Instrumental) — 7:55
"Fresh!" (Bayside Boys Vocal Club Mix) — 4:14
"Fresh!" (Phat'N'Phunky Vocal Club Mix) — 7:12
"Fresh!" (Phat'N'Phunky Refreshed Dub) — 6:32

 CD single, UK & Europe (WEA095CDX)
"Fresh!" (Metro Radio Version) — 3:43
"Fresh!" (Apollo 440 Remix) — 7:53
"Fresh!" (Phat 'N' Phunky Refreshed Dub) — 6:32
"Fresh!" (Apollo 440 Instrumental) — 7:55
"Fresh!" (Bayside Boys Dub) — 3:42

 CD maxi, UK (WEA095CD)
"Fresh!" (Metro Radio Version) — 3:43
"Fresh!" (Bayside Boys Radio Edit) — 3:20
"Fresh!" (Bayside Vocal Club Mix) — 4:14
Album Teaser — 2:38

 CD maxi, UK (WEA095CDX)
"Fresh!" (Metro Radio Version) — 3:43
"Fresh!" (Apollo 440 Remix) — 7:53
"Fresh!" (Phat 'N' Phunky Refreshed Dub) — 6:32
"Fresh!" (Apollo 440 Instrumental) — 7:55
"Fresh!" (Bayside Boys Dub) — 3:42

Charts

References

1997 songs
1997 singles
Gina G songs
Songs written by Mark Taylor (record producer)
Songs written by Paul Barry (songwriter)
Warner Records singles